Barbodes palaemophagus was a species of cyprinid fish endemic to Lake Lanao in Mindanao, the Philippines. This species reached a length of  TL.

References

Barbodes
Endemic fauna of the Philippines
Fauna of Mindanao
Fish described in 1924
Taxonomy articles created by Polbot

Freshwater fish of the Philippines